Manuel 'Manolo' Pérez Rodrigo (born 31 August 1976) is a Spanish retired footballer who played as a central midfielder.

Over the course of six seasons (his professional career lasted 17 years) he amassed Segunda División totals of 159 games and 18 goals, representing in that tier Logroñés, Albacete, Cádiz, Hércules and Elche.

Football career
Pérez was born in Barcelona, Catalonia. During his extensive career he played for 17 different clubs, starting out at RCD Mallorca B. He signed with RCD Espanyol in 1998, spending the vast majority of the season with the reserves in the third division; on 14 March 1999, he made his first-team – and La Liga – debut in a game against FC Barcelona, in what would the first of only three competitive appearances during his tenure.

Subsequently, Pérez resumed his career in the second and third levels, with a brief top flight spell with Cádiz CF. After two solid years in division two with the side, with 39 matches and seven goals en route to promotion in the latter season, he appeared scarcely for the Andalusians in the top flight, scoring his only goal in the competition in a derby against Real Betis on 27 November 2005 (1–1 away draw), with his team being finally relegated.

From 2007 onwards, Pérez played exclusively in division three, never settling with a club. In early 2012, after having started the campaign with CD Roquetas, who eventually suffered relegation, the 35-year-old retired from professional football, continuing to play in the regional leagues.

References

External links

El Mundo stats 

1976 births
Living people
Footballers from Barcelona
Spanish footballers
Association football midfielders
La Liga players
Segunda División players
Segunda División B players
FC Barcelona C players
RCD Mallorca B players
CF Gavà players
RCD Espanyol B footballers
RCD Espanyol footballers
CD Logroñés footballers
Albacete Balompié players
CD Ourense footballers
Alicante CF footballers
Cádiz CF players
Hércules CF players
Elche CF players
Cultural Leonesa footballers
UE Lleida players
Racing de Ferrol footballers
UD Melilla footballers
Polideportivo Ejido footballers
AD Ceuta footballers
CD Roquetas footballers